Inuleae is a tribe of flowering plants in the subfamily Asteroideae.

Genera
Inuleae genera recognized by the Global Compositae Database as of April 2022:

Adelostigma 
Allagopappus 
Allopterigeron 
Amblyocarpum 
Antiphiona 
Anvillea 
Asteriscus 
Blumea 
Blumeopsis 
Buphthalmum 
Caesulia 
Calostephane 
Carpesium 
Chiliadenus 
Chrysophthalmum 
Coleocoma 
Cratystylis 
Cyathocline 
Cylindrocline 
Delamerea 
Dittrichia 
Doellia 
Duhaldea 
Epaltes 
Feddea 
Geigeria 
Ighermia 
Inula 
Iphiona 
Iphionopsis 
Jasonia 
Karelinia 
Laggera 
Lifago 
Limbarda 
Litogyne 
Merrittia 
Monarrhenus 
Musilia 
Nanothamnus 
Neojeffreya 
Nicolasia 
Ondetia 
Pallenis 
Pechuel-loeschea 
Pegolettia 
Pentanema 
Perralderia 
Pluchea 
Porphyrostemma 
Pseudoblepharispermum 
Pseudoconyza 
Pterocaulon 
Pulicaria 
Rhanteriopsis 
Rhanterium 
Rhodogeron 
Sachsia 
Schizogyne 
Sphaeranthus 
Stenachaenium 
Streptoglossa 
Telekia 
Tessaria 
Thespidium 
Triplocephalum 
Varthemia 
Vieraea

References

 
Asteraceae tribes